This is a list of known sex-hormonal crystalline aqueous suspension formulations. Brand names and developmental code names are in parentheses.

Single-drug formulations

Androgens
 Androstanolone
 Methandriol (Notandron, Protandren)
 Testosterone (Andronaq, Sterotate, Virosterone)
 Testosterone buciclate (20 Aet-1, CDB-1781; never marketed)
 Testosterone isobutyrate (Agovirin Depot, Perandren M, Testocryst, Virex-Cryst)
 Testosterone ketolaurate (Testosid)
 Testosterone nicotinate (Bolfortan, Linobol)
 Testosterone phenylacetate (Perandren, Androject)
 Testosterone propionate (Anertan, Perandren)

Estrogens
 Dienestrol diacetate (Farmacyrol KS)
 Diethylstilbestrol dipropionate (Cyren B)
 Estradiol (Aquadiol, Diogyn, Progynon Aqueous Suspension, Progynon Micropellets)
 Estradiol benzoate (Agofollin Depot, Ovocyclin M)
 Estrone (Estrone Aqueous Suspension, Kestrone, Theelin Aqueous)

Progestogens
 Medroxyprogesterone acetate (Depo-Provera)
 Progesterone (Agolutin Depot, Flavolutan, Luteosan, Lutocyclin M, Lutren)

Others
 Pregnenolone acetate (Enelone, Natolone, others)

Multi-drug formulations

Estrogens and progestogens
 Estradiol/megestrol acetate (Mego-E, Chinese injectable No. 2)
 Estradiol benzoate/progesterone (Sistocyclin)
 Estradiol benzoate/progesterone/lidocaine (Clinomin Forte)
 Estradiol cypionate/medroxyprogesterone acetate (Cyclofem, Lunelle)

Estrogens and androgens
 Estradiol benzoate/testosterone isobutyrate (Femandren M, Folivirin)

Estrogens, progestogens, and androgens
 Estrone/progesterone/testosterone (Tristeron, Tristerone)

Non-sex-hormonal aqueous suspensions

Corticosteroids
 Betamethasone acetate (Celestone Soluspan)
 Desoxycorticosterone pivalate (Percorten Pivalate)
 Methylprednisolone acetate (Depo-Medrol, Depo-Medrone)
 Triamcinolone acetonide (Kenacort Retard, Kenalog Retard)
 Triamcinolone diacetate (Ledercort-Retard)
 Triamcinolone hexacetonide (Aristospan)

Antipsychotics
 Aripiprazole lauroxil (Aristada)
 Aripiprazole monohydrate (Abilify Maintena)
 Fluspirilene (Redeptin)
 Paliperidone palmitate (Invega Sustenna)

See also
 List of combined sex-hormonal preparations
 List of androgen esters
 List of estrogen esters
 List of progestogen esters

References

Androgens and anabolic steroids
Drug-related lists
Estrogens
Progestogens